Zadie Smith FRSL (born Sadie; 25 October 1975) is an English novelist, essayist, and short-story writer. Her debut novel, White Teeth (2000), immediately became a best-seller and won a number of awards. She has been a tenured professor in the Creative Writing faculty of New York University since September 2010.

Biography
Sadie Smith was born on 25 October 1975 in Willesden to a Jamaican mother, Yvonne Bailey, and an English father, Harvey Smith, who was 30 years his wife's senior. At the age of 14, she changed her name from Sadie to Zadie.

Smith's mother grew up in Jamaica and emigrated to England in 1969. Smith's parents divorced when she was a teenager. She has a half-sister, a half-brother, and two younger brothers (one is the rapper and stand-up comedian Doc Brown, and the other is the rapper Luc Skyz). As a child, Smith was fond of tap dancing, and in her teenage years, she considered a career in musical theatre. While at university, Smith earned money as a jazz singer, and wanted to become a journalist. Despite earlier ambitions, literature emerged as her principal interest.

Education
Smith attended the local state schools, Malorees Junior School and Hampstead Comprehensive School, then King's College, Cambridge, where she studied English literature. In an interview with The Guardian in 2000, Smith corrected a newspaper assertion that she left Cambridge with a double First. "Actually, I got a Third in my Part Ones", she said. She graduated with upper second-class honours. While at university Smith auditioned unsuccessfully for the Cambridge Footlights.

At Cambridge, Smith published a number of short stories in a collection of new student writing called The Mays Anthology. They attracted the attention of a publisher, who offered her a contract for her first novel. Smith decided to contact a literary agent and was taken on by A. P. Watt. Smith returned to guest-edit the anthology in 2001.

Career
Smith's début novel White Teeth was introduced to the publishing world in 1997 before it was completed. On the basis of a partial manuscript, an auction for the rights was begun, which was won by Hamish Hamilton. Smith completed White Teeth during her final year at the University of Cambridge. Published in 2000, the novel immediately became a best-seller and received much acclaim. It was praised internationally and won a number of awards, among them the James Tait Black Memorial Prize, and the Betty Trask Award. The novel was adapted for television in 2002. In July 2000, Smith's debut was also the subject for discussion in a controversial essay of literary criticism by James Wood entitled "Human, All Too Inhuman", where Wood critiques the novel as part of a contemporary genre of hysterical realism where "‘[i]nformation has become the new character" and human feeling is absent from contemporary fiction. In an article for The Guardian in October 2001, Smith responded to the criticism by agreeing with the accuracy of the term and that she agreed with Wood's underlying argument that "any novel that aims at hysteria will now be effortlessly outstripped". However,  she rejected her debut being categorised alongside major authors such as David Foster Wallace, Salman Rushdie, and Don DeLillo and the dismissal of their own innovations on the basis of being hysterical realism. Responding earnestly to Wood's concerns about contemporary literature and culture, Smith described her own anxieties as a writer and argued that fiction should be "not a division of head and heart, but the useful employment of both".

Smith served as writer-in-residence at the ICA in London and subsequently published, as editor, an anthology of sex writing, Piece of Flesh, as the culmination of this role.

Smith's second novel, The Autograph Man, was published in 2002 and was a commercial success, although it was not as well received by critics as White Teeth.

After the publication of The Autograph Man, Smith visited the United States as a Fellow of the Radcliffe Institute for Advanced Study at Harvard University. She started work on a still-unreleased book of essays, The Morality of the Novel (a.k.a. Fail Better), in which she considers a selection of 20th-century writers through the lens of moral philosophy. Some portions of this book presumably appear in the essay collection Changing My Mind, published in November 2009.

Smith's third novel, On Beauty, was published in September 2005. It is set largely in and around Greater Boston. It attracted more acclaim than The Autograph Man: it was shortlisted for the Man Booker Prize, and won the 2006 Orange Prize for Fiction and the Anisfield-Wolf Book Award.

Later in the same year, Smith published Martha and Hanwell, a book that pairs two short stories about two troubled characters, originally published in Granta and The New Yorker respectively. Penguin published Martha and Hanwell with a new introduction by the author as part of their pocket series to celebrate their 70th birthday. The first story, "Martha, Martha", deals with Smith's familiar themes of race and postcolonial identity, while "Hanwell in Hell" is about a man struggling to cope with the death of his wife. In December 2008 she guest-edited the BBC Radio 4 Today programme.

After teaching fiction at Columbia University School of the Arts, Smith joined New York University as a tenured professor of fiction in 2010.

Between March and October 2011, Smith was the monthly New Books reviewer for Harper's Magazine. She is also a frequent contributor to The New York Review of Books. In 2010, The Guardian newspaper asked Smith for her "10 rules for writing fiction". Among them she declared: "Tell the truth through whichever veil comes to hand – but tell it. Resign yourself to the lifelong sadness that comes from never being satisfied."

Smith's novel NW was published in 2012. It is set in the Kilburn area of north-west London, the title being a reference to the local postcode, NW6. NW was shortlisted for the Royal Society of Literature's Ondaatje Prize and the Women's Prize for Fiction. NW was made into a BBC television film directed by Saul Dibb and adapted by Rachel Bennette. Starring Nikki Amuka-Bird and Phoebe Fox, it was broadcast on BBC Two on 14 November 2016.

In 2015 it was announced that Smith, along with her husband Nick Laird, was writing the screenplay for a science fiction movie to be directed by French filmmaker Claire Denis. Smith later said that her involvement had been overstated and that she had simply helped to polish the English dialogue for the film.

Smith's fifth novel, Swing Time, was published in November 2016. It drew inspiration from Smith's childhood love of tap dancing. It was longlisted for the Man Booker Prize 2017.

Smith is a contributor to Margaret Busby's 2019 anthology New Daughters of Africa (as is her mother Yvonne Bailey-Smith).

Smith's first collection of short stories, Grand Union, was published on 8 October 2019. In 2020 she published six essays in a collection entitled Intimations, the royalties from which she said she would be donating to the Equal Justice Initiative and New York’s COVID-19 emergency relief fund.

In 2021, Smith debuted her first play, The Wife of Willesden, which she wrote after learning that her borough in London, Brent, had been selected in 2018 as the 2020 London's Borough of Culture. As the most famous current writer from Brent, Zadie was the natural choice to author the piece. She chose to adapt the Wife of Bath's Tale in Geoffrey Chaucer's Canterbury Tales, recalling how she had translated Chaucer into contemporary English at Oxford. The retelling replaces the pilgrimage with a pub crawl set in contemporary London, with the Wife of Bath becoming Alvita, a Jamaican-born British woman in her mid-50's who challenges her Auntie P's traditional Christian views on sex and marriage. Like the original tale, Alvita is a woman who has had five husbands, with her experiences with them ranging from pleasant to traumatic. The majority of the piece is spent on her talking to the people in the pub, much like how the Wife of Bath's prologue is longer than the tale itself. To her, Alvita's voice is a common one she heard growing up in Brent, and thus writing this play was a natural choice for the festival. The tale itself is set in 17th century Jamaica, where a man guilty of rape is brought before the Queen, who decrees that his punishment is to go and find what women truly desire.

Personal life
Smith met Nick Laird at Cambridge University. They married in 2004 in King's College Chapel, Cambridge. Smith dedicated On Beauty to "my dear Laird". She also uses his name in passing in White Teeth: "An' all the good-lookin' men, all the rides like your man Nicky Laird, they're all dead."

The couple lived in Rome, Italy, from November 2006 to 2007, and lived in New York City and Queen's Park, London for about 10 years before relocating to Kilburn, London in 2020. They have two children.

Smith describes herself as "unreligious", and was not raised in a religion, although retains a "curiosity" about the role religion plays in others' lives. In an essay exploring humanist and existentialist views of death and dying, Smith characterises her worldview as that of a "sentimental humanist".

Bibliography

Novels
 White Teeth (2000)
 The Autograph Man (2002)
 On Beauty (2005)
 NW (2012)
 Swing Time (2016)
 The Fraud (Forthcoming, 2023)

Plays
The Wife of Willesden (2021)

Short fiction 
Collections
Martha and Hanwell (2005)
 Grand Union: Stories (2019)
Stories

Non-fiction
 Changing My Mind: Occasional Essays (2009)
 Stop What You're Doing and Read This! (2011) (with Carmen Callil, Mark Haddon, Michael Rosen and Jeanette Winterson)
 "Some Notes on Attunement: A voyage around Joni Mitchell", The New Yorker, 17 December 2012, and later featured in The Best American Essays (2013)
 
 "On optimism and despair", The New York Review of Books, 22 December 2016; speech given on accepting the Welt-Literaturpreis
 Fences: A Brexit Diary (2016)
 
 Feel Free: Essays (2018)
  From Introduction to Darryl Pinckney, Busted in New York and Other Essays (Farrar, Straus and Giroux, 2019)
 Intimations (2020)

As editor
 Piece of Flesh (2001)
 The Burned Children of America (2003) (with Dave Eggers)
 The Book of Other People (2007)

Critical studies and reviews of Smith's work
 Tew, Philip (ed.). Reading Zadie Smith: The First Decade and Beyond. London: Bloomsbury, 2013.
 Tew, Philip. Zadie Smith. London and New York: Palgrave Macmillan, 2010.
 Walters, Tracey (ed.). Zadie Smith: Critical Essays. New York: Peter Lang Publications, 2008.
Feel free
 
NW
 
 
———————
Notes

Awards and recognition
She was elected a fellow of the Royal Society of Literature in 2002. In a 2004 BBC poll of cultural researchers, Smith was named among the top twenty most influential people in British culture.

In 2003, she was included on Granta's list of 20 best young authors, and was also included in the 2013 list. She joined New York University's Creative Writing Program as a tenured professor on 1 September 2010. Smith has won the Orange Prize for Fiction and the Anisfield-Wolf Book Award in 2006 and her novel White Teeth was included in Time magazine's list of the 100 best English-language novels from 1923 to 2005. 
 White Teeth: won the Whitbread First Novel Award, the Guardian First Book Award, the James Tait Black Memorial Prize, and the Commonwealth Writers’ First Book Award. Included on Time magazine's 100 best English-language novels published from 1923 to 2005
 The Autograph Man: won the Jewish Quarterly Wingate Literary Prize
 On Beauty: won the Commonwealth Writers’ Best Book Award (Eurasia Section), and the Orange Prize for Fiction; shortlisted for the Man Booker Prize
 NW: shortlisted for the Royal Society of Literature Ondaatje Prize and the Women's Prize for Fiction
 Swing Time: longlisted for the Man Booker Prize 2017
 Granta′s Best of Young British Novelists, 2003 and 2013
 2016: Welt-Literaturpreis
 2017: Langston Hughes Medal awarded on 16 November at the Langston Hughes Festival at The City College of New York.
 2019: Infinity Award, Critical Writing and Research, International Center of Photography
 2018: National Book Critics Circle Award for Criticism for Feel Free
 2020: Grand Union named a finalist for The Story Prize
 2022: Grammy Award for Album of the Year win as a featured artist on We Are by Jon Batiste
 2022: received the Bodley Medal, the Bodleian Libraries' highest honour, "awarded to individuals who have made outstanding contributions to the worlds of books and literature, libraries, media and communications, science and philanthropy", presented by Richard Ovenden.
 2022: PEN/Audible Literary Service Award in recognition of Smith's "remarkable achievements as a novelist, short story writer, and essayist whose work displays unparalleled attention to craft and humane ideals".
 2022: Critics' Circle Theatre Award for "Most Promising Playwright" (The Wife of Willesden)

References

 Kalpaklı, Fatma.  British Novelists and Indian Nationalism [in Mary Margaret Kaye’s Shadow of the Moon] (1957)
 James Gordon Farrell’s The Siege of Krishnapur (1973)
 Zadie Smith’s White Teeth (2000)]”.  Bethesda: Academica Press, 2010. .

External links
 Stewart, Alison. Interview with Zadie Smith about her work Grand Union. Interview and discussion broadcast on WNYC Public Radio show All Of It with Alison Stewart on 16 October 2020 (recorded in 2019). 
 Curry, Ginette. Toubab La!: Literary Representations of Mixed-race Characters in the African Diaspora. Newcastle, England: Cambridge Scholars Publishing, 2007, .

 "Girl Wonder" on Salon.com (2000).
 Joy Press, "Only Connect" , an interview with Zadie Smith in the Village Voice, 13 September 2005.
 Stephanie Merritt, "She's young, black, British – and the first publishing sensation of the millennium", The Observer, 16 January 2000.
 Wyatt Mason, "White Knees", an essay on Smith's body of work, Harper's Magazine, October 2005.
 Zadie Smith article archive from The New York Review of Books
 "Mind the Gap" in Guernica Magazine, January 2012.
 Broadcaster Philippa Thomas on the London of Zadie Smith's NW, London Fictions, 2012.
 Alison Flood, "Zadie Smith criticises author who says more than one child limits career", The Guardian, 13 June 2013
 Zadie Smith on Desert Island Discs, BBC Radio 4, 22 September 2013.
 Brian Tanguay, "A Conversation with Zadie Smith", Santa Barbara Independent, 21 November 2017.
 Yara Rodrigues Fowler, "Where to start with: Zadie Smith", The Guardian, 27 May 2022.

1975 births
Living people
20th-century English women writers
20th-century English novelists
20th-century essayists
21st-century British short story writers
21st-century English novelists
21st-century English women writers
21st-century essayists
Alumni of King's College, Cambridge
Black British women writers
British Book Award winners
British women essayists
British women short story writers
English people of Jamaican descent
English short story writers
English women novelists
Fellows of the Royal Society of Literature
Harper's Magazine people
James Tait Black Memorial Prize recipients
New York University faculty
People from Willesden
Radcliffe fellows
The New Yorker people
English republicans
Writers from London